Two British Royal Navy warships have been named Hedingham Castle, after Hedingham Castle in Essex.  They were both s built during the Second World War.

  was transferred to the Royal Canadian Navy before launching and renamed .  She was launched on 26 January 1944.
  was launched on 30 October 1944 and broken up in 1958.

Royal Navy ship names